Yahya Soumaré (born 23 June 2000) is a French professional footballer who plays as a forward for  club Bourg-en-Bresse, on loan from Lyon.

Early life 
Born in Vénissieux, a town in the Lyon Metropolis, Soumaré first played with ASM Vénissieux before joining Lyon in 2015, signing his first professional contract there in 2020.

Club career 
Soumaré made his professional debut for Lyon on 23 December 2020, coming on as a late substitute for Tino Kadewere in a 3–0 Ligue 1 home win over Nantes.

On 16 June 2021, Soumaré joined Ligue 2 side Dijon on loan for the 2021–22 season.

On 4 December 2021, he was loaned to Championnat National club Annecy.

On 4 August 2022, Soumaré moved on loan to Bourg-en-Bresse.

International career
Born in France, Soumaré is of Malian descent. He is a youth international for France.

References

External links

2000 births
Living people
People from Vénissieux
French footballers
France youth international footballers
French sportspeople of Malian descent
Association football forwards
ASM Vénissieux players
Olympique Lyonnais players
Dijon FCO players
FC Annecy players
Football Bourg-en-Bresse Péronnas 01 players
Ligue 1 players
Ligue 2 players
Championnat National 2 players
Championnat National players
Sportspeople from Lyon Metropolis
Footballers from Auvergne-Rhône-Alpes